The South Africa cricket team toured Zimbabwe from 9 to 21 August 2014, playing one Test match and three One Day International (ODI) matches against the Zimbabwean team. South Africa won the one-off Test match and won the ODI series 3-0.

Squads

Test series

Only Test

ODI series

1st ODI

2nd ODI

3rd ODI

References

External links
 Series at CricInfo

2014 in South African cricket
2014 in Zimbabwean cricket
International cricket competitions in 2014
South African cricket seasons from 2000–01
2014